George Lee (13 April 1851 – 22 May 1931) was a New Zealand cricketer. He played in four first-class matches for Canterbury from 1870 to 1976.

See also
 List of Canterbury representative cricketers

References

External links
 

1851 births
1931 deaths
New Zealand cricketers
Canterbury cricketers
Cricketers from Chelsea, London